Jason Nelson Robards Jr. (July 26, 1922 – December 26, 2000) was an American actor. Known as an interpreter of the works of playwright Eugene O'Neill, Robards received two Academy Awards, a Tony Award, a Primetime Emmy Award, and the Cannes Film Festival Award for Best Actor. He is one of 24 performers to have achieved the Triple Crown of Acting.

Early life 
Robards was born July 26, 1922, in Chicago, Illinois, the son of actor Jason Robards Sr. (1892–1963) and Hope Maxine Robards (née Glanville; 1895–1992). He was of German, English, Welsh, Irish, and Swedish descent.

The family moved to New York City when Jason Jr. was still a toddler, and then moved to Los Angeles when he was six years old. Later interviews with Robards suggested that the trauma of his parents' divorce, which occurred during his grade-school years, greatly affected his personality and world view.

As a youth, Robards also witnessed first-hand the decline of his father's acting career. The elder Robards had enjoyed considerable success during the era of silent films, but he fell out of favor after the advent of "talkies" (sound film), leaving the younger Robards soured on the Hollywood film industry.

The teenage Robards excelled in athletics, running a 4:18-mile during his junior year at Hollywood High School in Los Angeles. (Note: The California state high school mile run record in 1940 was 4:26.) Although his prowess in sports attracted interest from several universities, Robards decided to enlist in the United States Navy upon his graduation in 1940.

Naval service in World War II
Following the completion of recruit training and radio school, Robards was assigned to the heavy cruiser  in 1941 as a radioman 3rd class. Contrary to some stories, he did not see the devastation of the Japanese attack on Hawaii until Northampton returned to Pearl Harbor two days later. Northampton was later directed into the Guadalcanal campaign in World War II's Pacific theater, where she participated in the Battle of the Santa Cruz Islands.

During the Battle of Tassafaronga in the waters north of Guadalcanal on the night of November 30, 1942, Northampton was sunk by hits from two Japanese torpedoes. Robards found himself treading water until near daybreak, when he was rescued by an American destroyer. For its service in the war, Northampton was awarded six battle stars.

Two years later, in November 1944, Robards was radioman aboard the light cruiser , the flagship for the invasion of Mindoro in the northern Philippines. On December 13, she was struck by a kamikaze aircraft off Negros Island in the Philippines. The aircraft hit one of the port five-inch gun mounts, while the plane's two bombs set the midsection of the ship ablaze. With this damage and 223 casualties, Nashville was forced to return to Pearl Harbor and then to the Puget Sound Naval Shipyard in Bremerton, Washington, for repairs.

Robards served honorably during the war, but was not a recipient of the U.S. Navy Cross, contrary to what has been reported in numerous sources. The inaccurate story derives from a 1979 column by Hy Gardner.

Aboard Nashville, Robards first found a copy of Eugene O'Neill's play Strange Interlude in the ship's library. Also while in the Navy, he first started thinking seriously about becoming an actor. He had emceed for a Navy band in Pearl Harbor, got a few laughs, and decided he liked it. His father suggested he enroll in the American Academy of Dramatic Arts (AADA) in New York City, from which he graduated in 1948.

Robards left the Navy in 1946 as a Petty officer first class. He was awarded the Good Conduct Medal of the Navy, the American Defense Service Medal, the American Campaign Medal, the Asiatic–Pacific Campaign Medal, and the World War II Victory Medal.

Career
Robards moved to New York City and began working on radio and stage. His first role was the 1947 short film Follow That Music. His big break was landing the starring role in José Quintero's 1956 off Broadway theatre revival production and the later 1960 television film of O'Neill's The Iceman Cometh, portraying the philosophical salesman Hickey; he won an Obie Award for his stage performance. He later portrayed Hickey again in another 1985 Broadway revival also staged by Quintero. Robards created the role of Jamie Tyrone in the original Broadway production of O'Neill's Pulitzer Prize- and Tony Award-winning Long Day's Journey into Night, which was also directed by Quintero; Robards appeared in the lead role of James Tyrone Sr., in a 1988 production of the same play. Other O'Neill plays directed by Quintero and featuring Robards included Hughie (1964), A Touch of the Poet (1977), and A Moon for the Misbegotten (1973). He repeated his role in Long Day's Journey into Night in the 1962 film and televised his performances in A Moon for the Misbegotten (1975) and Hughie (1984).

Robards also appeared onstage in a revival of O'Neill's Ah, Wilderness! (1988) directed by Arvin Brown, as well as Lillian Hellman's Toys in the Attic (1960), Arthur Miller's After the Fall (1964), Clifford Odets's The Country Girl (1972), and Harold Pinter's No Man's Land (1994).

He made his film debut in the two-reel comedy Follow That Music (1947), but after his Broadway success, he was invited to make his feature debut in The Journey (1959). He became a familiar face to movie audiences throughout the 1960s, notably for his performances in A Thousand Clowns (1965) repeating his stage performance, Hour of the Gun as Doc Holliday (1967), The Night They Raided Minsky's (1968), and Once Upon a Time in the West (1968).

He appeared on television anthology series, including two segments in the mid-1950s of CBS's Appointment with Adventure.

Robards portrayed three presidents in films. He played Abraham Lincoln in the television film The Perfect Tribute (1991) and supplied the voice for two television documentaries, first for "The Presidency: A Splendid Misery" in 1964, and then again in the title role of the 1992 documentary miniseries Lincoln. He also played the role of Ulysses S. Grant in The Legend of the Lone Ranger (1981) and supplied the Union General's voice in the PBS miniseries The Civil War (1990). He also played Franklin D. Roosevelt in FDR: The Final Years (1980). Robards also played in the 1970 film Tora! Tora! Tora!, a depiction of the attack on Pearl Harbor on December 7, 1941, that led the United States into World War II.

Robards appeared in two dramatizations based on the Watergate scandal. In 1976, he portrayed Washington Post executive editor Ben Bradlee in the film All the President's Men, based on the book by Carl Bernstein and Bob Woodward, winning the Academy Award for Best Supporting Actor. The next year, he played fictional president Richard Monckton (based on Richard Nixon) in the 1977 television miniseries Washington: Behind Closed Doors, based on John Ehrlichman's roman à clef The Company. In 1983, Robards starred in the television movie The Day After where he played Dr. Russell Oakes.

Robards appeared in the documentary Empire of the Air: The Men Who Made Radio and played a cancer patient in the 1999 film Magnolia.

Awards

Robards received eight Tony Award nominations, more than any other male actor . He won the Tony for Best Performance by a Leading Actor in a Play for his work in The Disenchanted (1959); this was also his only stage appearance with his father.

He received the Academy Award for Best Supporting Actor in consecutive years: for All the President's Men (1976), portraying Washington Post editor Ben Bradlee, and for Julia (1977), portraying writer Dashiell Hammett. He was also nominated for another Academy Award for his role as Howard Hughes in Melvin and Howard (1980).

Robards received the Primetime Emmy Award for Outstanding Lead Actor in a Limited Series or Movie for his role in the television film Inherit the Wind (1988).

In 1997, Robards received the U.S. National Medal of Arts, the highest honor conferred to an individual artist on behalf of the people. Recipients are selected by the U.S. National Endowment for the Arts and the medal is awarded by the President of the United States.

In 1999, he was among the recipients at the Kennedy Center Honors, an annual honor given to those in the performing arts for their lifetime of contributions to American culture.

In 2000, Robards received the first Monte Cristo Award, presented by the Eugene O'Neill Theater Center, and named after O'Neill's home. Subsequent recipients have included Edward Albee, Kevin Spacey, Wendy Wasserstein, and Christopher Plummer.

Robards narrated the public radio documentary, Schizophrenia: Voices of an Illness, produced by Lichtenstein Creative Media, which was awarded a 1994 George Foster Peabody Award for Excellence in Broadcasting. According to Time, Robards offered to narrate the schizophrenia program, saying that his first wife had been institutionalized for that illness.

Robards is in the American Theater Hall of Fame, inducted in 1979.

Military awards

Personal life and death
Robards was married four times and had six children. With his first wife, Eleanor Pittman, Robards had three children, including Jason Robards III. His second marriage to actress Rachel Taylor lasted from April 1959 to May 1961. He and actress Lauren Bacall, his third wife whom he married in 1961, had actor Sam Robards. Robards and Bacall divorced in 1969, in part due to his alcoholism. Robards had two more children with his fourth wife (widow), Lois O'Connor.

In 1972, Robards was seriously injured in an automobile crash when he drove his car into the side of a mountain on a winding California road, requiring extensive surgery and facial reconstruction. The crash may have been related to his longtime struggle with alcoholism. Robards overcame his addiction and went on to publicly campaign for alcoholism awareness. Robards was an American Civil War buff and scholar, an interest which informed his portrayal of the voice of Ulysses S. Grant in The Civil War series by filmmaker Ken Burns.

Robards was a resident of the Southport section of Fairfield, Connecticut. He died of lung cancer in Bridgeport, Connecticut, on December 26, 2000. His remains were buried at Oak Lawn Cemetery in Fairfield.

Legacy
The Jason Robards Award was created by the Roundabout Theatre Company in New York City in his honor and his relationship with the theater.

Work

Stage

Source:

Film

Television

References

External links

 
 
 
 
  (archive)

1922 births
2000 deaths
20th-century American male actors
21st-century American male actors
Actors from Fairfield, Connecticut
American Academy of Dramatic Arts alumni
American male film actors
American male stage actors
American male television actors
American male voice actors
American people of English descent
American people of German descent
American people of Irish descent
American people of Swedish descent
American people of Welsh descent
Audiobook narrators
Best Supporting Actor Academy Award winners
Cannes Film Festival Award for Best Actor winners
Deaths from lung cancer in Connecticut
Kennedy Center honorees
Male actors from Chicago
Male actors from Los Angeles
Male actors from New York (state)
Male Spaghetti Western actors
Male Western (genre) film actors
Military personnel from California

Obie Award recipients
Outstanding Performance by a Lead Actor in a Miniseries or Movie Primetime Emmy Award winners
People from Southport, Connecticut
Shipwreck survivors
Tony Award winners
United States National Medal of Arts recipients
United States Navy personnel of World War II
United States Navy sailors